Tzi Ma (born June 10, 1962) is a Hong Kong-American actor. He is well known for his roles in television shows, such as The Man in the High Castle and 24, and films, such as Dante's Peak, Rush Hour, Rush Hour 3, Arrival, The Farewell, Tigertail, and Mulan. In 2021, he starred in the American martial arts television series Kung Fu on The CW.

Early life and education
Ma was born in Hong Kong, the youngest of seven children. In 1949, Ma's father moved to Hong Kong following the Chinese Communist Revolution, and then to the United States when Ma was five years old, following political turmoil in Hong Kong. Ma grew up in New York, where his parents ran the American Chinese restaurant, Ho Wah, in Staten Island. According to Ma, immigration activist Lau Sing Kee had previously operated the restaurant. He found his love for acting when he played Buffalo Bill in an elementary school production of Annie Get Your Gun.

Career

Although often referred to as the familiar Asian face in film and television, Ma has deep ties to theatre. He cites Mako's performance in Pacific Overtures in 1976 as a major influence on his acting career. And he is close friends with playwright David Henry Hwang, having collaborated with him on several plays, such as FOB, Yellow Face, Flower Drum Song, and The Dance and the Railroad, throughout the years and starring in the film, Golden Gate (1993), which was written by Hwang. Ma started professionally acting in 1973 through experimental theater. At that time, he was in a residency at Nassau Community College studying acting and teaching movement. His first theatre performance was in 1975 at an outdoor theater in Roosevelt State Park as the Monkey King in a stage adaptation of a Beijing opera titled, Monkey King in the Yellow Stone King. He estimated that there were about 5 to 10 thousand audience members in attendance.

Ma also practiced martial arts prior to doing film work. He leveraged those skills in his film debut as Jimmy Lee in Cocaine Cowboys (1979).

During the 1988 Writers Guild of America strike, Ma found work at South Coast Repertory in Orange County playing various characters in the play, In Perpetuity Throughout the Universe. The play closed the weekend the strike ended, and by next week, he landed a role in the L.A. Law television series. In 1994, he was the assistant director on a stage production of Maxine Hong Kingston's The Woman Warrior by the Berkeley Repertory Theatre.

His major film roles include credits in The Quiet American, the remake of The Ladykillers, Dante's Peak, and Tigertail. Additionally, he has appeared as Consul Han in the Rush Hour series, General Shang, the commander of the Chinese military in Denis Villeneuve's Arrival (2016), and Hua Zhou in Niki Caro's Disney live-action adaptation of Mulan (2020).

Ma has appeared in numerous Asian American-produced independent films, such as Red Doors, Catfish in Black Bean Sauce (1999), Baby (2007), The Sensei (2008), and The Farewell (2019).

Ma was interviewed for The Slanted Screen (2006), a documentary directed by Jeff Adachi about the representation of Asian, primarily East Asian, men in Hollywood.

Television 
He is also known for his recurring role as Cheng Zhi, the head of security for the Chinese Consulate (Los Angeles), on the television series 24, first appearing in the series's fourth season and reprising the role in 24: Live Another Day. He also voiced Bàba Ling, Francine's adoptive father, in the animated TV series American Dad!

He also had a role in the first season of Martial Law as Lee "Nemesis" Hei, first major antagonist and Sammo Law's arch-nemesis.

Ma's other TV credits include guest appearances on MacGyver, Walker, Texas Ranger, Law & Order, ER, Boomtown, Commander in Chief, Chicago Hope, The Unit, Star Trek: The Next Generation, L.A. Law, NYPD Blue, Millennium, Fringe, Cold Case, NCIS: Los Angeles, Hawaii Five-0, Lie to Me, The Cosby Show, Grey's Anatomy, Agents of S.H.I.E.L.D., and Hell on Wheels. Ma also had a voice role in the video game Sleeping Dogs. He also appeared on the ABC series Once Upon a Time as "The Dragon". He also appeared as a zen master on the USA series Satisfaction.

He appeared as General Onoda in the Amazon show The Man In The High Castle and as Tao on AMC’s Hell On Wheels. In July 2018, it was announced that Ma was cast in the recurring role of Mr. Young on the Netflix series Wu Assassins.

In 2020, Ma was cast as a series regular in The CW's modern reboot of Kung Fu (1972). The show was renewed for a second season spring 2021.

Filmography

Film

Television

Awards
Ma has received awards for his acting roles including the Cine Golden Eagle Award for Best Actor for The Dance and The Railroad and the Garland Award for his acting in Flower Drum Song.

References

External links

1962 births
Living people
20th-century American male actors
21st-century American male actors
American male film actors
American male television actors
American male voice actors
American male actors of Chinese descent
American male actors of Hong Kong descent
Hong Kong emigrants to the United States
Male actors from New York City
People from Staten Island